Esmeralda is a 1905 French short silent film based on the 1831 novel The Hunchback of Notre-Dame written by Victor Hugo. It was directed by Alice Guy-Blaché and Victorin-Hippolyte Jasset.

There are two characters in the film, Esmeralda (Denise Becker) and Quasimodo (Henry Vorins). The film is the oldest film adaptation of the novel.

Bibliography
Title: The Hunchback of Notre-Dame
Authors: Victor Hugo, Frederic Shoberl
Editor:	Carey, Lea and Blanchard, 1834

External links
 

1900s historical drama films
1905 films
French black-and-white films
French historical drama films
French silent short films
Films based on The Hunchback of Notre-Dame
Films directed by Alice Guy-Blaché
Films set in the 1480s
Films set in Paris
Films set in religious buildings and structures
1905 short films
Films about Romani people
Silent drama films
Silent horror films
1900s French films